The Zuni Sandstone is a geologic formation in west-central New Mexico. It marks the southernmost limit of Jurassic fluvial and lacustrine sedimentary formations, which pinch out to leave a single sandstone body.

Description
The Zuni Sandstone is found south of the I-40 corridor in west-central New Mexico. At about this latitude, the Todilto, Morrison, and Summerville Formations pinch out to leave a Jurassic section that is almost entirely composed of eolian sandstone. This is designated as the Zuni Sandstone, which is thus the lateral equivalent of the combined Entrada and Bluff Formations.

A break corresponds to the pinched-out Todilto and Summerville Formations. Then comes a break corresponding to the pinch-out of the Recapture Member of the Morrison Formation, another sandstone interval corresponding to the Acoma Tongue of the Zuni Sandstone, and a final break corresponding to the pinchout of the remaining Morrison Formation. The Zuni Formation unconformably rests on the Wingate Sandstone or Chinle Group and is unconformably overlain by the Dakota Formation.

History of investigation
The unit was first described by Clarence Dutton in 1885. However, A.A. Baker, C.H. Dane, and J.B. Reeside regarded it as identical to the Morrison Formation. R.J. Hackman and A.B. Olson renamed the beds as the Cow Springs Sandstone in 1977 O.J. Anderson proposed the modern definition of the formation in 1983.

References

Jurassic formations of New Mexico
Sandstone formations of the United States